Korkusuz Korkak is a 1979 Turkish comedy film directed by Natuk Baytan.

Cast 
 Kemal Sunal - Mülayim Sert
 Turgut Özatay - Ayı Abbas
 Ayşin Atav - Sevil
  - Patron
 Zafer Önen - Müdür

References

External links 

1979 films
Turkish crime comedy films
Gangster films
1970s crime comedy films
Turkish vigilante films
1979 comedy films